The , stylized as HiLux and historically as Hi-Lux, is a series of pickup trucks produced and marketed by the Japanese automobile manufacturer Toyota. The majority of these vehicles are sold as pickup truck or cab chassis variants, although they could be configured in a variety of body styles.

The pickup truck was sold with the Hilux name in most markets, but in North America, the Hilux name was retired in 1976 in favor of Truck, Pickup Truck, or Compact Truck. In North America, the popular option package, the SR5 (Sport Runabout 5-Speed), was colloquially used as a model name for the truck, even though the option package was also used on other Toyota models, like the 1972 to 1979 Corolla. In 1984, the Trekker, the wagon version of the Hilux, was renamed the 4Runner in Venezuela, Australia and North America, and the Hilux Surf in Japan. In 1992, Toyota introduced a newer pickup model, the mid-size T100 in North America, necessitating distinct names for each vehicle other than Truck and Pickup Truck. Since 1995, the 4Runner is a standalone SUV, while in the same year Toyota introduced the Tacoma to replace the Hilux pickup in North America.

Since the seventh-generation model released in 2004, the Hilux shares the same ladder frame chassis platform called the IMV with the Fortuner SUV and the Innova minivan.

Cumulative global sales in 2017 reached 17.7 million units. In 2019, Toyota revealed plans to introduce an electric-powered Hilux within six years.



First generation (N10; 1968) 

The vehicle was conceived by Toyota, and was developed and manufactured by Hino Motors at its Hamura Plant. In Japan, it was available at the Toyota Japan dealership retail chains called Toyota Store and Toyopet Store. The 1.5-litre engine was upgraded to a 1.6 L inline-four in February 1971.

In April 1969, a long-wheelbase version was added to the range. The short-wheelbase version also continued in production for many more years. The long-wheelbase version was not sold in the North American market until 1972, allowing the Datsun Truck to maintain a strong market presence. The Hilux was offered as a replacement to the Toyota Crown, Toyota Corona, and Toyota Corona Mark II based pickup trucks in Japan, as the Crown, Corona, and Corona Mark II were repositioned as passenger sedans.

In spite of the name "Hilux", it was a luxury vehicle only when compared to the Stout. The Hilux was engineered and assembled by Hino Motors to replace the earlier vehicle that the Hilux was derived from, called the Briska in the niche beneath the larger and older Stout – it replaced the Stout fully in some markets. For the North American market, the only body style was a regular cab short bed and all were rear-wheel drive. It used a typical truck setup of A-arms and coil springs in front and a live axle with leaf springs in back. A four-speed manual transmission was standard.

Engines 
Global markets:
 1968–1971: 1.5 L (1,490 cc) 2R I4
 1971–1972: 1.6 L (1,587 cc) 12R I4

North American markets:
 1969: 1.9 L (1,897 cc) 3R I4, 
 1970–1972: 1.9 L (1,858 cc) 8R SOHC I4, 
 1972: 2.0 L (1,968 cc) 18R SOHC I4,

Second generation (N20; 1972) 

In May 1972, the 1973 model year Hilux was introduced, designated the RN20. Nicknamed the "RokeHi" (ロケハイ), a portmanteau of "Rocket Hilux", it has a more comfortable interior along with exterior updates. A  "long bed" was an option for the first time in North American markets, although such a version had been available worldwide since April 1969. This received the "RN25" chassis code. The 2.0 litre 18R engine was available in Japan as well, with a three-speed automatic transmission available as an option. The 2.0-litre automatic model managed a "gentle"  top speed in a period road test conducted in South Africa, in spite of a claimed .

The Hilux was radically redesigned in 1975 to be larger and with increased standard equipment. In North America, the new version also meant the introduction of the larger (2.2 L) 20R engine and the SR5 upscale trim package. A five-speed manual transmission became optional. In North America, the Hilux name was fully phased out in favour of "Truck" by that year, having been dropped from brochures and advertising campaigns, starting in 1973. Some North American motor-coach manufacturers began building Toyota motor-homes from the Hilux.

Engines 
Global markets:
 1972–1978: 1.6 L (1587 cc) 12R I4,  (SAE gross, Japan),  (SAE net, general export)
 1973–1978: 2.0 L (1968 cc) 18R I4,  (SAE gross, Japan)

North American markets:
 1973–1974: 2.0 L (1968 cc) 18R SOHC I4, 
 1975–1978: 2.2 L (2189 cc) 20R SOHC I4,

Third generation (N30, N40; 1978) 

The redesigned Hilux was introduced in August 1978, with a 4WD variant introduced in January 1979. The newer model was of similar dimensions to its predecessor, but both front and rear tracks were wider. Another change was the front suspension was changed from coil springs to a torsion bar design, still with a double wishbone layout. The 4WD variant – not offered with any engines smaller than the two-litre "18R" – featured some common technology with the larger Toyota Land Cruiser. Its front axle was a live, leaf-sprung design unlike the more car-like type used on rear-wheel drive Hiluxes. Production of the four-wheel drive models stopped in July 1983, but some 2WD variations continued production in parallel with the next generation models. The L series diesel engine was offered on the 2WD variants from September 1979 and also on the 4WD variants beginning in March 1983. In Japan, the Hilux was joined with the all new Toyota MasterAce, sharing load carrying duties which was sold at Toyota Store locations alongside the Hilux.

These were all built on the longer wheelbase, with either pickup or cab-chassis bodywork.

In North American markets, the Hilux (known as the Pickup) saw the use of four-wheel drive. It had a solid front axle and leaf suspension. The body saw a redesign that included single round headlights and a less complex body. This new 4WD setup featured a gear driven RF1A transfer case. This transfer case is unique in that its low-range reduction portion can be replicated, using what some refer to as a dual or triple transfer case. This results in a much lower overall gear ratio. It was the first Hilux available with an automatic transmission in that market.

In 1981, a vehicle development agreement was established between Toyota, Winnebago Industries and two other aftermarket customisers. This was to allow Toyota to enter the SUV market in North America. The vehicles which resulted from this collaboration were the Trekker (Winnebago), Wolverine, and the Trailblazer (Griffith). All three used the Hilux 4×4 RV cab and chassis, and an all-fiberglass rear section (the Trailblazer had a steel bed with a fiberglass top). Research and development work on the Trekker led to the development of the 4Runner/Hilux Surf, which was introduced in 1984.

Toward the end of the SR5's production run (1983 model year), Toyota introduced the luxury Mojave trim for the US market as a limited-production (3,500 units) model with options not available on any other Toyota pickup. Cruise control, power steering, and air conditioning were optional. It was powered by the SR5's standard  inline-four engine.

In Thailand, this model was sold as the Toyota Hilux Super Star.

Engines 
 1981–1983: 1.8 L preflow, 4-speed manual (Australia),

Fourth generation (N50, N60, N70; 1983) 

The August 1983 redesign (sold as model year 1984 vehicles in North America) introduced the Xtracab extended cab option, with six inches of space behind the seat for in-cab storage. These models carried over the carbureted 22R engine while model year 1984 also saw the introduction of the fuel injected 22R-E engine. Two diesel engines were also offered, the 2L and the turbocharged 2L-T. The engines were discontinued in the U.S. after the 1986 model year, this was due to higher performance expectations from customers and the wide availability of inexpensive petrol. The next year saw the introduction of a turbocharged option, the 22R-TE, perhaps due to increasing competition from Nissan who already offered a V6 truck at this time. The solid front axle was replaced with an independent front suspension/torsion bar setup in the 4×4 model in 1986, and optional automatic differential disconnect for the front differential (an alternative to automatic locking hubs). 1985 was the last year of the solid front axle in most markets. The solid front axle would remain in the 5th generation 4×4 LN106 model until 1997. Solid front axles had been present in all 4×4 Toyota models until 1986.

In late 1986 for the 1987 model year, the truck went through a minor interior and exterior redesign, that included a new grille, a new 1 piece front bumper, an updated interior with full high door panels with faux leather stitching on the base and DLX models, the gauge cluster surround was more rounded and featured faux leather stitching on it, the dash pad featured a shorter tray than earlier models, the steering wheels were changed from black to gray, red, brown, or blue depending on the interior colour, the radio bezel was also colour matched to the rest of the interior, the SR-5 tach gauge clusters had the pattern on the face changed from a grid pattern to horizontal lines, the outside door mirrors were also changed to have a more stream lined appearance, the faceplate for the heater controls was also redesigned. A V6 engine was introduced in 1988. The Hilux-based 4Runner which made its entry in Australia, North America and the United Kingdom was based on this generation of the Hilux; in some other markets, such as Japan, it was called the Hilux Surf.  In North America, the automatic shifter on 2WD models was relocated to the column.

Toyota introduced a new generation of the Hilux in most markets in late 1988 but the fourth generation remained in production until 1997 in South Africa. The company quoted that this was due to South African "content laws" which made it cheaper to continue the production of the fourth generation of the Hilux, rather than to retool the plant for the fifth generation model.

In Thailand, this generation was sold as the Toyota Hilux Hero.

Engines

Fifth generation (N80, N90, N100, N110; 1988) 

Its one-piece cargo-box walls eliminated the rust-prone seams that were found in earlier models. The V6 Xtracab SR5 earned Motor Trend magazine's Truck of the Year award that year. The Xtra Cabs now featured more room behind the front seats than the last generation which allowed optional jump-seats for rear passengers, a feature more in line with competitors of the time.

In 1991, North American production began at the NUMMI plant in Fremont, California. The Hilux received a minor facelift in 1991 (for the 1992 model year), which was a grille change incorporating the new Toyota emblem that had been recently adopted.

It was during this generation that Toyota discontinued the Hilux line in North America (where it was marketed as the "Toyota Pickup"), replacing it with the new Tacoma for the 1995 model year.

Engines 
 1988–1995:  2Y-U I4,  at 5,000rpm  at 3,200rpm
 1988–1995:  2Y I4,  at 4,800rpm  at 2,800rpm (export markets)
 1989–1995:  3VZ-E V6,  at 4,800 rpm

Volkswagen built and marketed the Hilux under the Volkswagen Taro name from February 1989 to March 1997.

This generation of the Hilux was sold in Thailand as the Toyota Hilux Mighty-X.

Sales in South America 
 Colombia, Ecuador and Venezuela: the Hilux was produced in Colombia from 1994 to 1997 by the Sofasa company equipped with the 22R-E 2.4 L petrol engine. For these markets the model number for the 4WD double cabin was RN106 -instead of the standard number LN106-. 
 For sales in Argentina, Brazil, and Uruguay, the Hilux was produced in Argentina from 1997 through 2005 (Zárate Plant – both petrol and diesel engines).
 For sales in Bolivia, Chile, Paraguay and Peru, the Hilux was imported from factories in Japan from 1989 to 1997 (petrol and diesel engines).

The available options for these markets were:

 single cab chassis (2WD, 4WD, petrol engines) (Colombia and Ecuador)
 single cab long bed (2WD, 4WD, petrol and diesel engines - all South American markets; diesel engine not available in Colombia, Ecuador, and Venezuela)
 Xtracab (2WD, 4WD, petrol - only Bolivia)
 crew cab (2WD, 4WD, petrol and diesel engines - all South American markets; Diesel engine not available in Colombia, Ecuador, and Venezuela)

North America

In North America, the Hilux continued to be sold simply as the "Toyota Pickup". A wide range of models were available (excluding the Crew Cab model available internationally), mixing four- and six-cylinder engines, long and short beds, regular and Xtracabs, manual and automatic transmissions, and two- or four-wheel drive. Initially only imported from Japan, NUMMI-built trucks began appearing in 1990. The VIN on these trucks starts with '4T', while Japanese-made ones begin with 'JT'. However, some trucks sold in the United States during the 1991 through 1995 model years were still manufactured in Japan as not all versions were built in California.

While the fifth generation Hilux continued to be sold elsewhere in the world until 1997, in North America it was replaced by the new Tacoma after an abbreviated 1995 model year.

Sixth generation (N140, N150, N160, N170; 1997) 

The Hilux received a minor design update for 1997 and the addition of a few more engine options. The Hilux was then facelifted in 2001 for the 2002 model year.

In 2005, Toyota ceased production of the Hilux truck for the Japanese market. This was the last generation of the Hilux to be built in Japan.

Engines 
 1998–2001 2.0 L (1,998 cc) 1RZ-E 8-valve SOHC I4 (Hilux 'Workmate' models in Australia) (4×2)
 1998–1999 3.0 L (2,986 cc) 5L diesel I4,  (4×2, 4×4)
 1995–2004 2.4 L (2,438 cc) 2RZ-FE 16-valve DOHC I4,  (4×2, 4×4)
 1995–2004 2.7 L (2,693 cc) 3RZ-FE 16-valve DOHC I4,  (4×2, 4×4)
 1995–2004 3.4 L (3,378 cc) 5VZ-FE 24-valve DOHC V6, 
1998-2001 2.4 L (2,446 cc) 2L-T UK Spec - Turbo Diesel single valve 8-valve I4 83/62 hp/kW at 4,000 rpm, 16.8/165 kg⋅m/N⋅m at 2,200 rpm (4×4)
1998-2004 2.8 L (2,779 cc) 3L diesel I4, 65 kW (89 PS; 88 hp) (4×4) (Philippines, Malaysia, SAE Net, UN Spec)

South American markets
The Hilux was produced in Colombia for sales in Colombia, Venezuela, and Ecuador from 1998 to 2005 by the SOFASA company (with only petrol engines 2.7 L). In Venezuela and Ecuador, the single-cab 2WD chassis/long bed is called the Stout II. For sales in Bolivia, Chile, Paraguay, Peru, it was imported from Japan from 1998 through 2004 (petrol engined 2.7 L, and diesel engined 2.8 L). This model was not sold in Argentina or Brazil because the fifth-generation Hilux had received a redesign and upgrade. Options for South American markets included:
 Single cab chassis (2WD, 4WD, petrol engines) (for sales in Colombia and Ecuador)
 Single cab long bed (2WD, 4WD, petrol and diesel engines) (all South American countries)
 Xtracab (4WD, petrol and diesel engines) (in Bolivia only)
 Crew cab (2WD, 4WD, petrol and diesel engines) (all South American countries, named the Hilux Millenium from 2002 through to the present)

Thailand market
Toyota shifted production from the Hilux Mighty-X (fifth generation) to the Hilux Tiger (sixth generation) in the late 1990s and made it the global export hub. The Thailand-made Hilux Tiger went through the following versions:
 1998–1999: Hilux Tiger with the 3.0 L 5L engine
 2000–2001: Hilux Tiger with the 3.0 L 5L-E EFI engine
 2001: Hilux Tiger with 1KZ engine (short-lived and immediately replaced by D4D engine)
 Late 2001 – late 2004: Hilux Tiger SportCruiser with D4D engine

Sport Rider 

Toyota introduced a mid-size SUV variant of the Hilux in 1998. The variant called the Sport Rider was sold only in Thailand. The Sport Rider is based on the Hilux, both in style and underpinnings it is similar in concept to the Toyota 4Runner—however, it's not a rebadged 4Runner. The Sport Rider frame and suspension system are derived from the Hilux, including the Hilux's independent front suspension and leaf-sprung rear suspension. The vehicles began as four-door pickup trucks and were then modified into wagons on arrival in Thailand by Thai Auto Works Co (a majority Thai-owned company in which Toyota has a 20 percent stake). 

Engine options for the Sport Rider included the 5L engine for the PreRunner (2WD), the 5L, and the 5L-E engine for 4WD. Toyota introduced the first facelift in 2001 with the 1KZ-TE engine and foglamps integrated with the front bumper, Toyota introduced the second facelift in 2002 with the 1KD-FTV engine for 4WD and the 2KD-FTV engine for the PreRunner (2WD) and 4WD, a new front bumper, new projector-style headlights, and new rear lamps. Toyota discontinued the Sport Rider in 2004 and replaced it with the Toyota Fortuner in 2005.

Engines 
 1998–2002:  5L-E I4 SOHC EFI,  at 4,000 rpm  at 2,600 rpm
 1998–2002:  5L I4,  at 4,000 rpm  at 2,400 rpm (Prerunner)

Seventh generation (AN10, AN20, AN30; 2004) 

The seventh-generation Hilux (designated the AN10/AN20/AN30), part of the IMV program led by chief engineer Kaoru Hosokawa, started production in Thailand during August 2004. Three pickup truck body variants were initially produced: a two-door Single Cab (referred to by Toyota as IMV1), a two-door Xtra Cab (IMV2), and four-door Double Cab (IMV3). In September 2008, Toyota introduced the Smart Cab, a four-door cab with hidden rear clamshell doors. The IMV program also spawned the Toyota Innova (AN40) minivan (IMV4) and Toyota Fortuner (AN50/AN60) SUV (IMV5).

Mainly developed in Thailand, this seventh-generation Hilux was the first to not be produced in Japan. Hilux models sold in Asian, European, Middle Eastern and Oceanian markets were initially built and assembled in Thailand with targeted annual production of 280,000 units, with 140,000 allocated for exports. Later, production was delegated to Malaysia and Southeast Asia in order to increase sales in those regions. In Thailand, the vehicle is called the Hilux Vigo. For other European markets and South Africa, the Hilux was built in Durban, South Africa. Hiluxes sold in Argentina and Brazil were built in Argentina, as with the previous generation Hilux.

The double cab model has an automatic transmission.

The ladder frame chassis used by the seventh-generation Hilux is 45 percent stiffer compared to its predecessor. Combined with a reduction in the number of welded joints with the use of a unified inner frame, it has a higher torsional stiffness while the vertical rigidity is improved by stronger crossmembers. The model also used a new double wishbone front suspension which was said to improve stability and ride comfort.

The model is also considerably larger than the previous generation Hilux. For the double cab variant, the 2005 model is  longer and  wider. The increased size was achieved without a significant increase in the kerb weight. Drag coefficient is rated 0.36 (0.39 with over fenders), which was claimed to be "class-leading" during the time of its introduction.

In Singapore, the Hilux was available as a single cab with the 2.5 L engine or a double cab with the 3.0 L engine.

This generation of the Hilux was introduced for Argentina on 2 March 2005 in Buenos Aires with a market launch in April.

This generation of the Hilux was also sold in Finland as the TruckMasters OX by Truck Masters Finland. Because of a modified rear suspension, the truck is registered in Finland as a light truck. The OX was only available with a 3.0-litre D-4D diesel engine.

Engines 
 2005 2.0 L petrol VVT-i DOHC I4 (South Africa, Indonesia and Middle East)
 2005 2.5 L diesel D-4D DOHC I4, Turbo-diesel  –  (Asia, Europe, South Africa, South America)
 2005 2.7 L petrol VVT-i DOHC I4,  (Australia, Arabian Peninsula, Philippines, South Africa, Venezuela)
 2005 3.0 L diesel D-4D DOHC I4, Turbo-diesel, common rail 16-valve direct injection,   (Asia, South Africa, South America, Australia, Europe). This version is made at Toyota's facility in Zárate, Argentina.
 2005 4.0 L petrol VVT-i DOHC V6,  –  (Australia, South Africa, Venezuela, China)
 2008 4.0 L Supercharged DOHC V6  (Australia only, TRD Hilux 4000S & 4000SL)

2008 facelift 
A facelifted version of the Hilux was unveiled by Toyota's Malaysian distributors, UMW Toyota Motor, in August 2008. Toyota has introduced a left hand drive Hilux Vigo in August 2008 while a right hand drive facelifted model was introduced in September 2008. These facelifted models were introduced in the Philippines in October 2008.

Toyota also introduced a four-door extended cab called "Smart Cab" to replace all Xtra Cab models in E and G grade. The Smart Cab models were developed in Thailand and were only sold in the Thai market.

2011 facelift 
This update was initially launched in Thailand.

2012 Hilux Vigo Champ 
The Hilux Vigo "Champ" was introduced in Thailand in August 2012 as a significant "minor change" with a new front design and a revamped interior to reinforce perceived luxury. The front was redesigned from the A pillar forwards. With the exception of the doors, roof and tailgate, everything else was new: new guards, new headlights, new bumper, new bonnet, new three-bar grille, new taillights, a new rear bumper and new badges. There were also new mirrors and new alloy wheel designs. The interior features a new upper dashboard design with a new horizontal center instrument cluster. Perceived quality was improved through the adoption of uniformly darker finishes with greater colour consistency throughout the interior. The high-end Double Cab version now came with a DVD player, rear camera and Bluetooth functionality.

Other changes included a more efficient fuel injection system and the addition of a center headrest on the rear double cab seat.

The Vigo Champ CNG included the 2.7-litre 2TR-FE bi-fuel engine that could run on compressed natural gas (CNG).

Safety 
The Hilux in its most basic Latin American configuration with 3 airbags received 5 stars for adult occupants and 5 stars for infants from Latin NCAP in 2015.

Eighth generation (AN110, AN120, AN130; 2015) 

The eighth-generation Hilux was introduced simultaneously on 21 May 2015 in Bangkok, Thailand and Sydney, Australia. It is the first of the Toyota IMV family to receive a new generation, with the related Fortuner and Innova received a new generation in July and November respectively. In some Asian markets such as Thailand, Laos, Cambodia and Pakistan, the model also adopted a new moniker, Hilux Revo.

The model was subsequently introduced in the Philippines in July 2015, Mexico and GCC countries in August 2015, Argentina and Brazil in November 2015, while in Europe specifications was unveiled in September 2015 for a mid-2016 market introduction. Introductions of the model in more markets started in 2016. In March 2016, the model was released in South Africa, where it is also produced. In Malaysia, it was launched in May 2016, while in Pakistan it was launched in September 2016. In September 2017, Toyota released the Hilux in Japan for the first time since 2004.

The eighth-generation Hilux features the "Keen Look" design language with a slimmer headlight shape (with optional projector headlights and LED daytime running lights). This design continues into the interior with similar AC vents and center fascia design, which has been described as more "car-like". First for a Hilux, this generation is available with optional autonomous emergency braking system (AEB).

Development 
Development of the vehicle was led by Hiroki Nakajima as a chief engineer, which visited 120 countries during its development. It was reported that in 2011, Toyota started over on the new Hilux in just six months into development due to the release of Volkswagen Amarok and Ford Ranger that reset Toyota's benchmark for "car-like driving". Toyota President and CEO Akio Toyoda personally intervened to set the Hilux on a new development path.

Toyota stated the eighth-generation Hilux received larger cabin space front and rear with  extra shoulder room,  extra head room,  higher seat height and  larger rear knee room. It also feature a broader seat adjustment range and a larger  fuel tank. It is also equipped with rear air vents as an option, making it one of the few pickups in its segment with rear air vents at the time of its launch.

The front bumper has a bigger bulge to meet new pedestrian safety regulations, while the lower section of the front bumper has been shaped to ensure the Hilux is more agile than its predecessor in off-road conditions. In the Middle East, the Hilux received an optional steel front bumper. The approach angle is 31 degrees and the departure angle is 26 degrees, compared to the previous 30 and 23 respectively.

The new ladder-frame chassis gives the vehicle a 20 percent increase in torsional rigidity compared to the previous generation model. The stronger FIRM (Frame with Integrated Rigidity Mechanism) makes use of high-tensile strength steel and more spot welds. The improved body structure is said to yield lower noise, vibration and harshness levels. It is also equipped with a newly developed Dynamic Control Suspension system and Body Control with Torque Demand.

Three different suspension setups are available for the Hilux for different markets. Vehicles destined for Australia, South Africa, Russia and South America receive an Australian-developed heavy-duty suspension setup that offers improved off-road performance, better vibration suppression and improved roll stiffness. Vehicles sold in Thailand receive a comfort-biased setup due to the large market of pickup trucks for personal use. The third suspension setup is a general setup that is "suited to all road conditions the world over." The suspension used is a front double wishbone with a thicker front stabiliser bar and rear leaf spring configuration. It is aimed to give the Hilux a more "car-like" driving experience.

Markets

Argentina
As of 2016, the Argentine version has about 40% of locally and 60% of regionally made parts.

Australia 
During its introduction in Australia, the eighth-generation Hilux was offered with 31 variants, eight more than its predecessor, with 4×2 and 4×4, single, extra and double cabin styles, and WorkMate, SR and SR5 grade levels. Toyota has also added Hi-Rider variants for SR and SR5 models, with added ride height, heavy-duty suspensions, larger front ventilated disc brakes and larger rear drum brakes.

Four engine options are offered in the market, ranging from the 2.4-litre turbo-diesel, 2.8-litre turbo-diesel (with different outputs for both 4×2 and 4×4), 2.7-litre petrol and 4.0-litre V6 petrol, and continues to be imported from Thailand.

It comes equipped with a standard reversing camera, up to seven airbags, electronic stability control, trailer sway control and rear parking sensors.

In March 2017, the TRD appearance package became available. In January 2018, Toyota introduced the Hilux Rugged X, Rogue and Rugged variants which was fully designed, developed and engineered in Australia. Based on the double-cab 4×4 Hilux, the three variants are targeted towards "urban adventurers" with off-road related changes and additions. The 2020 facelift was presented in August, which also introduced upgraded diesel engines and Toyota Safety Sense.

In September 2022, the Hilux Rogue received upgrades such as wider tracks and fenders, larger 18-inch wheels, rear disc brakes replacing drum brakes and larger front brake discs. It also gained extended front suspension arms, a lengthened rear axle, revised rear dampers, and a rear anti-roll bar, which are claimed to increase the vehicle's roll rigidity by 20 percent.

In January 2023, the GR Sport model became available in Australia with a different styling compared to the Hilux GR Sport in other markets, by sharing many elements with the Hilux Rogue. Powered with the 2.8-litre diesel engine, it received engine upgrades, heavy-duty suspension, wider fenders and wider track.

Europe 
The eighth-generation Hilux entered the European market such as the UK in April 2016 with customer deliveries in July. It was available in Active, Icon, Invincible and Invincible X grade levels and single, extra and double cab body styles. The sole powertrain option is the 2.4-litre diesel engine. The 2020 facelift model received an optional 2.8-litre diesel engine, and a GR Sport variant since 2022.

Like the previous generation, this generation has also been sold as the TruckMasters OX in Finland by Truck Masters Finland since 2017. The modified suspension means that the truck is registered as a light truck in Finland, leading to lower taxes.

India 
In India, the Hilux was unveiled in January 2022 and went on sale in late March 2022. Mainly marketed as a "lifestyle utility vehicle", it is offered in Low and High trim levels. Models sold in India are assembled at Toyota Kirloskar Motor's plant in Bidadi, Karnataka and 30 percent of its components are sourced locally.

Japan 
The Hilux was reintroduced in Japan on 12 September 2017, after 13 years of hiatus. Initial orders for the vehicle exceeded 2,000 in the first month of sales. For the Japanese market, the Hilux is imported from Thailand, with only double-cab 4WD configuration available in two trim levels "X" and "Z", both equipped with 2.4-litre 2GD-FTV engine and a 6-speed automatic transmission.

Philippines 
The eighth-generation Hilux was launched in the Philippines in July 2015. It was initially offered in 2.4 Cab & Chassis (manual only), 2.4 J (manual only), 2.4 E (manual only), 2.4 G 4×2 (manual and automatic) and 2.8 G 4×4 (manual and automatic) grades.

In September 2020, the Hilux received a facelift and is offered in 2.4 Cab & Chassis (manual only), 2.4 Cargo (manual only) 2.4 FX (manual only), 2.4 J (available either in 4×2 or 4×4, manual only), 2.4 E 4×2 (manual only), 2.4 G 4×2 (manual and automatic), 2.4 Conquest 4×2 (manual and automatic) and 2.8 Conquest 4×4 (manual and automatic) grades. In August 2022, the Hilux gained a feature list upgrade.

South Africa 
, Toyota South Africa Motors (TSAM) would export more than 55,000 Hilux and Fortuner units to 74 countries, including Africa (43 markets), Europe (28 markets) and Latin America (three markets). Exports included right-hand-drive and left-hand-drive variants, and would consist of more than 50 percent of TSAM’s total 2016 Hilux and Fortuner production.

Thailand 
Thailand is the major export hub for the Hilux, with 60 percent of local production allocated for exports . Initial plans were to export 186,000 units to over 130 countries with a focus on major markets such as Australia, New Zealand, the Middle East, South America, and UK.

The domestic market model is marketed as the Hilux Revo, which consists of single, extra cab (Smart Cab) and double cabin (Double Cab) body styles, with both Smart Cab and Double Cab model receiving an optional high-riding Prerunner model.

In March 2016, the TRD Sportivo appearance package became available. In November 2017, Hilux Revo Rocco also introduced as the highest grade level. The Rocco features a grey rear bumper bar, 18-inch alloy wheels with all-terrain tyres, a black sports bar with bed liner, Rocco insignia, gloss black grille, black metallic trim on the interior along with a redesigned instrument cluster. The engine and safety features for the Rocco remain unchanged. Since September 2018, the Hilux Revo Rocco is also available with the 2.4-litre diesel engine. In August 2021, the Hilux Revo received GR Sport variants for low-riding and high-riding models.

2017 facelift 
A minor redesign of the Hilux was unveiled in November 2017 in Thailand. It features a different front grille styling similar to the North American market Tacoma and a different front bumper with LED fog lights. In Thailand, the redesigned front fascia is only applied to the 4×4 and high-riding 4×2 Prerunner variants, while the entry-level, low-riding 4×2 versions was largely unchanged with minor revisions. In Australia, it was released in August 2018 with the changes restricted to the higher grade levels, SR and SR5, while the basic WorkMate models are unchanged. The rest of the exterior is identical to the initial model. A range-topping Hilux Revo Rocco was also introduced in Thailand, which features exterior accessories.

The Rocco was introduced in Malaysia as Hilux L-Edition in 2018. In the Philippines, the Rocco was introduced in February 2018 as the Conquest. In the UK, this styling was only available for the 'Invincible X' variant, which was launched at the Commercial Vehicle Show on 24 April 2018. In Japan, this model was sold as the Z "Black Rally Edition", which was announced on 12 November 2018 and released on 17 December 2018 to commemorate the 50th anniversary since the launch of the first generation Hilux.

2020 facelift 
In June 2020, Toyota unveiled the second facelift of the AN110/120/130 series Hilux for Asia, Europe and South America. The second facelift model received revised front and rear with LED headlamps and tail-lamps and front LED indicators, a first for the Hilux, and redesigned 18-inch alloy wheels. Revisions inside the interior include a new design for the instrument cluster and the 4.2-inch multi-info display. A more rugged-styled Hilux with larger front grille surface and black fender flares was introduced with different names, such as the Rocco in Thailand and Pakistan, Rogue in Australia and Malaysia, Conquest in the Philippines and South America, Adventure in the UAE, and Invincible X in Europe.

Dampers on the 4×4 and 4×2 high-riding versions of the 2020 facelift Hilux have been revised for improved ride comfort with less vibration, particularly with less payload. Leaf spring bushings have been updated for better comfort on rough roads, as well as steering response during cornering and lane changes. A self-lubricating rubber for the rear shackle bush is also added for better ride comfort.

For some Southeast Asian markets, the Hilux became available with Toyota Safety Sense. This facelift of the Hilux was introduced in Japan in August 2020 and is offered in base X and Z trim levels.

GR Sport 
The GR Sport version was first released in São Paulo, Brazil in November 2018. It is based on the flagship SRX variant available in South America with additional stiffer front springs, monotube dampers, Gazoo Racing exterior graphics, a new design honeycomb grille insert with 'Toyota' badging, matte black wheel arch extensions, a black bonnet and roof, side steps, 17-inch alloy wheels with all-terrain tyres, and GR badging, without performance upgrades.

The facelift model GR Sport version was released in Thailand on 25 August 2021, in Japan on 8 October 2021, in the Philippines on 23 October 2021, and in Europe on 4 January 2022. It was also released in Indonesia on 7 December 2022 after being previewed at the 29th Gaikindo Indonesia International Auto Show in August 2022.

In January 2023, a specialised GR Sport model for the Australian market was released. It received a different styling compared to the Hilux GR Sport in other markets, with more off-road focused upgrades such as extended wheel-arch fender flares, wider track, heavy-duty suspension, and heavy-duty 'rock sliders' instead of side-steps.

Powertrain 
The model is available with the newly developed 2.4-litre and 2.8-litre GD series diesel engines, combined with a 6-speed manual transmission or a 6-speed automatic transmission with sequential shift technology. The manual model, touted as an "intelligent" manual helps eliminate shift shock by matching engine revs to the transmission speed. The 2.8-litre GD engine was introduced in May 2015 at the 36th International Vienna Motor Symposium. The GD engines is equipped common-rail direct-injection, variable-nozzle turbos, exhaust gas recirculation and an optional stop/start system. It is claimed to use 10 percent less fuel than the older KD engines.

The older KD series 2.5-litre along with 3.0-litre diesel engines was offered in several market alongside the newer GD series engines. The 2.0-litre, 2.7-litre and 4.0-litre petrol engines from the previous generation returned with a Dual VVT-i update for increased power and torque. , the 5L-E engine option is marketed by Toyota Gibraltar Stockholdings along with other distributors in Africa such as Senegal, and for institutional purchase by governmental entities and NGOs accredited by the UN, only with a 5-speed manual transmission and four-wheel drive.

Safety 

The updated Hilux in its most basic Latin American configuration with 7 airbags received 5 stars for adult occupants and 5 stars for infants from Latin NCAP in 2019.

Hilux Revo BEV Concept 
The Hilux Revo BEV Concept is an EV conversion prototype based on the eighth-generation Hilux (Hilux Revo in Thailand) single cab that was presented on 14 December 2022 at the 60th anniversary event of Toyota Motor Thailand.

Production and sales

Worldwide production 

In 2017, Toyota reported the Hilux sold around 521,000 units in 190 countries, with production in 6 countries. 167,000 units were sold in Asia, 116,000 in South America, 65,000 in the Middle East, 55,000 in Africa, 51,000 in Oceania, 41,000 in Europe, 19,000 in North America, and around 1,000 in Japan. In the same year, 310,500 units were produced in Thailand, 103,000 produced in Argentina, 76,500 produced in South Africa, 18,200 produced in Malaysia, 6,500 produced in Pakistan, and 600 produced in Venezuela.

Sales

Reputation 
The Hilux has often been described as having a high level of durability and reliability during sustained heavy use or even abuse.

This reputation was highlighted in several episodes of the BBC motoring show Top Gear. The Hilux suffered severe structural damage, but was still running after being repaired with only the typical tools that would be found in a truck's toolbox. This Hilux became one of the background decorations in the Top Gear studio. In the later series 8, episode 3, a Hilux was chosen by Jeremy Clarkson as his platform for creating an amphibious vehicle (though by the end of that episode the Hilux failed to start), and in the Top Gear: Polar Special Clarkson and James May raced a specially modified 2007 model Hilux to the magnetic north pole from Northern Canada – making that truck the first motor vehicle to have made that journey. The camera crew's vehicle from this episode was later modified and driven to near the summit of the Eyjafjallajökull erupting Icelandic volcano by James May, in Series 15, Episode 1.

In 1999, the Hilux appeared in a series of "Bugger" television advertisements in New Zealand and Australia, exaggerating its power and durability for comic effect. The adverts were banned in New Zealand after receiving 120 complaints, but later reinstated.

A world record was achieved by the support crew for the participants in the 2008/2009 Amundsen Omega 3 South Pole Race.

Despite being discontinued in Japan prior to 2017, the Hilux had been popularly grey-imported throughout private importers. This fact, along with the existing Hilux users' requests, encouraged Toyota to revive the Hilux in Japan after it had been discontinued 13 years earlier.

Racing 

Two Hilux pickups entered the Dakar Rally in 2012, prepared by the Imperial Toyota team of South Africa. Driver Giniel de Villiers achieved third place in the 2012, second place overall in the 2013, 4th in the 2014, and again second place in the 2015. These however, were heavily modified non-production versions built around a custom racing-only tubular chassis and using a larger capacity Toyota V8 engine. Since 2016, the Dakar Rally Hilux has been prepared by Toyota Gazoo Racing WRT. Giniel achieved third place with it in 2016, 5th in 2017, 3rd in 2018 and 9th in 2019. Nasser Al-Attiyah won the 2019 Dakar Rally, earning the first ever Toyota victory in the Dakar Rally, he also came in second in 2018 and 2021. In the 2020 Dakar Rally, six Hilux cars were entered prepared by Gazoo Racing, and another nine by Overdrive Racing. A new, wider, heavier, featuring larger wheels Toyota GR DKR Hilux T1+ was built by Gazoo Racing for 2022 Dakar Rally, equipped with 3.5l twin-turbo V6 engine, based on Toyota Land Cruiser 300 GR Sport.

Use by militant groups 

Due to its durability and reliability, the Toyota Hilux, along with the larger Toyota Land Cruiser (J70), has become popular among militant groups in war-torn regions as a technical. According to terrorism analyst Andrew Exum, the Hilux is "the vehicular equivalent of the AK-47. It's ubiquitous to insurgent warfare." U.S. counter-terror officials have inquired with Toyota how the Salafi jihadist extremist group Islamic State has apparently acquired large numbers of Toyota Hiluxes and Land Cruisers. Mark Wallace, the CEO of the Counter Extremism Project said, "Regrettably, the Toyota Land Cruiser and Hilux have effectively become almost part of the ISIS brand."

The Toyota War between Libya and Chad in 1986 and 1987 was named as such because of the heavy, successful use of Hilux and Land Cruiser trucks for technicals.

References

External links 

  (Japan)
 50 years of Hilux

Hilux
Cars introduced in 1968
1970s cars
1980s cars
1990s cars
2000s cars
2010s cars
2020s cars
Pickup trucks
Rear-wheel-drive vehicles
All-wheel-drive vehicles
Off-road vehicles
Latin NCAP pick-ups
Dakar Rally winning cars